A-thút or A-thoot is a river in Myanmar, in the Pathein District. It is born on Kyunlaha Lake and runs southwest on flat lands until it empties into the river Kyun-kabo not far from Paya-thun-zu. It is navigable about 25 km in rainy season.

See also
List of rivers of Myanmar
Geography of Myanmar

References 

Rivers of Myanmar